Ma'qūda is a Maghrebi fritter made of a potato-based batter. In addition to puréed potato, the batter can contain garlic, salt, hot pepper, egg, and cheese.
 
In Algeria, the fritter is very popular across the northern part of the country sold, as a sandwich in fast food restaurants usually with harissa. Ma'qūda is also called khbizat ma'dnos in the east, while in the west, it is sometimes stuffed with cheese or ground meat and eaten with harrira soup.

It is a cheap food enjoyed by students and others of modest means in cities such as Fes.

References 

Fritters
Maghrebi cuisine
Potato dishes